Primus AB is a manufacturer of portable cooking devices and outdoor stoves based in Stockholm, Sweden.

History 
The firm was founded in 1892 by Frans Wilhelm Lindqvist and Johan Viktor Svenson. They were the developers of its initial product, the Primus stove, the first portable and soot-free kerosene stove.

The first units were sold mainly to women who operated street market shops (stallholders) in Stockholm. Explorers then discovered the value in having a portable stove for their expeditions. For example, on Salomon August Andrée’s 1897 North Pole expedition, he cooked on a Primus. Roald Amundsen carried a Primus stove with him on his venture to the South Pole in 1911. And in 1953, Sir Edmund Hillary and Tenzing Norgay relied on Primus stoves during their first ascent of Mount Everest. 
 
Today, Primus stoves and lanterns are sold in over 70 countries. 

The stoves are made in Primus'  factory in Tartu, Estonia.

Ownership 
Primus AB is owned by Fenix Outdoor International AG, which is on the stock exchange in Stockholm. The parent owns the brands, Brunton (USA), Fjällräven (Sweden), Hanwag (Germany), Tierra (Sweden), Royal Robin (USA) as well as the retail chains Naturkompaniet (Sweden) and Partioaitta (Finland), Globetrotter(Germany).

Product range 
Primus offers products for cooking, heating and lighting, although the focus is still on stoves. They make LPG (liquified petroleum gas) stoves for backpacking and camping, multi-burner camping stoves to high-end multifuel expedition stoves. Primus also produces lanterns, vacuum bottles and accessories such as cutlery, cookware and other camping equipment.

One of the most successful stoves in the Primus range is the OmniFuel. When introduced in 2001, it was the first stove to burn LPG, white gas, kerosene, jet fuel and even diesel. It has received awards from specialist outdoor and mountaineering magazines.

In 2007, Primus introduced its first Eta Power stoves. The Greek letter Eta stands for “efficiency” in physics. The Eta series consists of various cooking systems (burner, windshield, pots with heat exchanger) that increase fuel efficiency up to twice that of conventional stoves.

2012 Primus introduced the OmniLite stove, a lighter and more compact version of the OmniFuel, optimized for use with Eta Pots.

References

External links 

Dauerbrenner: Die Primus-Story

Camping equipment manufacturers
Manufacturing companies based in Stockholm
Swedish brands